The 2016 South Tyneside Council election took place on 5 May 2016 to elect members of South Tyneside Council in England. This was on the same day as other local elections.

Results by electoral ward

Beacon & Bents ward

Bede ward

Biddick & All Saints ward

Boldon Colliery ward

Cleadon & East Boldon ward

Cleadon Park ward

Fellgate & Hedworth ward

Harton ward

Hebburn North ward

Hebburn South ward

Horsley Hill ward

Monkton ward

Primrose ward

Simonside & Rekendyke ward

West Park ward

Westoe ward

Whitburn & Marsden ward

Whiteleas ward

References

2016 English local elections
2016
21st century in Tyne and Wear